"Yipsee-I-O" is a song written by Ray Gilbert, and recorded by Carmen Miranda with the Andrews Sisters on January 6, 1950. It was presented by Miranda in a musical number from the film Nancy Goes to Rio, produced by MGM.

References

External links
Yipsee-I-O on All Music
Gravações americanas de Carmen Miranda

1950 songs
Carmen Miranda songs
The Andrews Sisters songs
Songs with lyrics by Ray Gilbert